Mitcham Eastfields (initially known as Eastfields during planning and construction) is a railway station in London, United Kingdom, which opened on 2 June 2008. The station is located at Eastfields Road level crossing, in an area previously poorly served by public transport. It is in fare zone 3.

History
Proposals for the station have apparently existed since the 1930s. Planning permission was granted by the London Borough of Merton in August 2007. Construction started in October 2007. Following consultation, there were hopes to have the station open by December 2007.

The opening was originally scheduled for 19 May 2008 but that date was subsequently put back because Network Rail did not feel the station would be ready until early June. The opening was then planned for the morning of Monday 2 June 2008, but in the event it was delayed until the afternoon by safety inspections. It finally opened at 16:00 and the first train called at 16:11.

Design

The station cost £6 million, and was the second station to be built to a modular design developed by Network Rail, which is also used at Corby railway station and Greenhithe railway station which was the first to be constructed. Each platform is situated downstream of the level crossing, allowing the crossing to be reopened while trains are stopped at the station, minimising the disruption to road traffic. However this means that passengers must cross Eastfields Road (no controlled crossing at present) if they wish to purchase a ticket on the northbound side and then travel southbound. The footbridge on the southbound side only allows safe movement over the railway and not the road.

Services
Services at Mitcham Eastfields are operated by Southern and Thameslink using  and  EMUs.

The typical off-peak service in trains per hour is:

 2 tph to 
 2 tph to  via 
 2 tph to 

During the peak hours, additional services between London Victoria and Epsom also call at the station.

On Saturday evenings (after approximately 18:45) and on Sundays, there is no service south of Dorking to Horsham.

Connections
London Buses routes 152, 463 and school route 633 serve the station.

References

External links

Eastfields station plan (3.47 MiB)
A photo of the station under construction from Railway Gazette International.

Railway stations in the London Borough of Merton
Railway stations opened by Network Rail
Railway stations in Great Britain opened in 2008
Railway stations served by Govia Thameslink Railway